Henry Bruce Stanley (2 May 195322 September 1999) was a Scottish painter and decorator who was shot dead by the Metropolitan Police in London in contentious circumstances. Initially his death was recorded with an open verdict, before being ruled as unlawful killing by a jury on appeal and finally returned to an open verdict by the High Court.

Background
Stanley was born in Bellshill, near Glasgow, Scotland, where he lived for the first 19 years of his life. He moved to London in the early 1970s in search of work, and married his childhood sweetheart, Irene. They had three children, and grandchildren, and lived in Hackney, east London. He had a previous criminal record, being convicted of armed robbery in 1974, and had served 4 years in prison for grievous bodily harm.  This was unknown to the police officers who responded to the call about "an Irishman with a gun wrapped in a bag". The 46-year-old painter and decorator had recently been released from hospital after an operation for colon cancer at the time of his death.

Shooting
On 22 September 1999, Stanley was returning home from the Alexandra Pub in South Hackney carrying, in a plastic bag, a table leg that had been repaired by his brother earlier that day. Someone had phoned the police to report "an Irishman with a gun wrapped in a bag".

At the junction of Fremont Street and Victoria Park Road in South Hackney, close to his home, Inspector Neil Sharman and PC Kevin Fagan, the crew of a Metropolitan Police Armed Response Vehicle challenged Stanley from behind. As he turned to face them, they shot him dead at a distance of 15 feet (5 m).

Hearings

First inquest
The first inquest jury in 2002 returned an open verdict. Stanley's family were unhappy with this outcome, particularly as the coroner, Dr. Stephen Chan, had only allowed the jury to return either a verdict of lawful killing or an open verdict.

Judicial review
Stanley's widow, Irene, petitioned the High Court and succeeded in obtaining a judicial review of the first inquest. On 7 April 2003 Mr. Justice Sieber ordered a fresh inquest after ruling that there had been an "insufficient inquiry".

During the new hearing, coroner Dr. Andrew Reid heard that the two officers fired the shots after being given wrong information in a tipoff; they had been told that Stanley was carrying a weapon and had an Irish accent. The new jury returned a verdict, in November 2004, of unlawful killing, which resulted in the suspension of the officers involved.

In protest at the suspensions, over 120 out of the 400 Metropolitan Police officers authorised to use firearms handed in their firearms authorisation cards, with Glen Smyth, a Police Federation spokesman saying, "The officers are very concerned that the tactics they are trained in, as a consequence of the verdict, are now in doubt." The officers' suspensions were lifted shortly afterwards.

High Court
In May 2005 the High Court decided that there was "insufficient evidence" for the verdict of unlawful killing, overturning it and reinstating the open verdict of the first inquest. Mr. Justice Leveson also decided a third inquest should not be held, but added his weight to calls for reform of the inquest system. Glen Smyth described the ruling as "common sense", but the campaign group Inquest was disappointed, saying the verdict sent "a message that families cannot have any confidence in the system. They feel they cannot get justice when a death in custody occurs."

Police action
On 2 June 2005 the two officers involved in the shooting were arrested and interviewed, following an investigation by Surrey Police involving new forensic evidence. The Crown Prosecution Service decided in October 2005 not to press charges, saying that they "concluded that the prosecution evidence is insufficient to rebut the officers' assertion that they were acting in self defence".

On 9 February 2006 the Independent Police Complaints Commission published their report into the incident, recommending that no further disciplinary action be taken against the officers. Representatives of the Stanley family expressed their "bitter disappointment" and stated the case was a failure of the criminal justice system. The Metropolitan Police Federation stated, "We are, of course, delighted by the vindication of the officers. But we remain deeply disturbed at the way the whole matter has been handled." The report did make notable recommendations to the police in the post-incident procedure to be followed after a shooting.

See also
Police use of firearms in the United Kingdom

References

1999 deaths
1999 in London
Deaths by firearm in London
Deaths by person in London
People shot dead by law enforcement officers in the United Kingdom
September 1999 events in the United Kingdom
Metropolitan Police operations
History of the London Borough of Hackney